Rob Oakley may refer to:
 Rob Oakley (equestrian)
 Rob Oakley (rugby league)

See also
 Robert Oakley (disambiguation)